Lafaye is a surname. Notable people with the surname include:

Jacques Lafaye (born 1930), French historian
Jean-Jacques Lafaye (born 1958), French writer and journalist
Prosper Lafaye, originally Lafait (1806–1883), French painter

See also 
John Carroll (born Julian Lafaye, 1906–1979), American actor and singer
La Chapelle-en-Lafaye, is a commune in the Loire department in central France
Sharon Lafaye Jones (1956–2016), American soul and funk singer